The banderium was a military unit which was distinguished by the banner of a high-ranking clergyman or nobleman in the medieval Kingdom of Hungary. Its name derived from the Latin or Italian words for banner (banerium and bandiera, respectively).

References

Sources

See also 

 

Military units and formations of Hungary